Tricholoma dryophilum is a mushroom of the agaric genus Tricholoma. First described as a member of the genus Melanoleuca by William Alphonso Murrill in 1913, he transferred it to Tricholoma later that year.    It is toxic.

See also
List of North American Tricholoma

References

External links
 

Fungi described in 1913
Fungi of North America
dryophilum
Taxa named by William Alphonso Murrill